Steel Reign is a video game released in 1997-1998. It was developed by Chantemar Creations and published by Sony Computer Entertainment for PlayStation.

Reception 

Steel Reign received mixed to negative reviews. Electronic Gaming Monthlys Steve Harris liked the game, opining that it offers a good balance of realism and arcade fun which is enhanced by the selection of vehicles and weapons, but his three co-reviewers all said that it looks and plays like a generic first generation PlayStation game, with mostly non-interactive environments, rough and pixelation textures, and lack of color. One of them, Ken "Sushi-X" Williams, also argued that the selection of vehicles is meaningless since one tank is obviously superior to the others, and even with the weakest tank the game is boringly easy. Like EGM, Next Generation found the game's simplistic action dull and comparable to first generation PlayStation games, concluding that "Had Steel Reign been released at the same time as Warhawk, it may have seemed more impressive. As it is, it's just another action title with lots of guns and explosions." Glenn Rubenstein, writing for GameSpot, instead contended that the game has a frustrating level of challenge, and praised its full motion video sequences, selection of weapons, multiplayer mode, and soundtrack, assessing that "it definitely ranks in the top 10 percent of what is currently out there." GamePro found the maze-like level designs in Steel Reign irritatingly restrictive, and while agreeing that the multiplayer mode is fun, felt that it was soured by the fact that matches are so short, they are nearly outlasted by their load times. They summarized that "Every time a bright side to this game pops up, it's pummeled by four problems. This one's a rental at best." IGN gave the game an above-average review, a few weeks before its U.S. release date.

The Electric Playgrounds Tommy Tallarico gave the game a 6/10, while co-host Victor Lucas gave it a 4/10.

Notes

References

External links 
 

1997 video games
PlayStation (console) games
PlayStation (console)-only games
Science fiction video games
Sony Interactive Entertainment games
Tank simulation video games
Third-person shooters
Video games developed in the United States
Video games set in the future